A dendrite is a branching projection of the cytoplasm of a cell. While the term is most commonly used to refer to the branching projections of neurons, it can also be used to refer to features of other types of cells that, while having a similar appearance, are actually quite distinct structures.

Non-neuronal cells that have dendrites:
Dendritic cells, part of the mammalian immune system
Melanocytes, pigment-producing cells located in the skin
Merkel cells, receptor-cells in the skin associated with the sense of touch
 Corneal keratocytes, specialized fibroblasts residing in the stroma.

Cell biology